Sara Louisa Oberholtzer (Vickers; May 20, 1841 – February 2, 1930) was an American poet, activist, and economist. Interested in the uplifting of humanity, she gave close attention to the introduction of school savings-banks into the public schools since 1889. She made an address on the subject in the first meeting of the Women's Council, in Washington, D.C. in February, 1891, which was printed in their "Transactions." Her address on school savings banks before the American Academy of Political and Social Science, in Philadelphia, in May, 1892, was printed in pamphlet form by the Academy. Her "How to Institute School Savings Banks," "A Plea for Economic Teaching " and other leaflet literature on the subject had broad circulation. She was widely instrumental in establishing school savings banks in the United States, Canada, Australia and the Sandwich Islands. She was also elected world's and national superintendent of that work for the Woman's Christian Temperance Union (W. C. T. U.), which enlarged its channels. As W. C. T. U. World's Superintendent of School Savings Banks, Oberholtzer hoped to introduce this system in other countries beyond the U.S.

Early years and education
Sara Louisa Vickers was born in Uwchlan Township, Chester County, Pennsylvania, on May 20, 1841. She was a daughter of Paxson and Ann T. Vickers, cultured Quakers of the time. The family were active abolitionists. Besides the hundreds of fugitives assisted on their way to Canada, the home entertained such guests as John G. Whittier, Lucretia Mott, William Lloyd Garrison, and Bayard Taylor. Oberholtzer's ancestors were public-spirited. She naturally came to the front early, taking a prominent part in literary and organization work from childhood.

She was educated at Thomas' Friends Boarding School, the State Normal School in Millersville, and by private tutors.

Career
She began to write for newspapers and magazines at the age of eighteen. She was at that time active president of a soldier's aid society, which rendered efficient assistance to the Union Army during the Civil War. Ill-health interfered with a medical course of study, for which she had prepared.

On January 1, 1862, she married John Oberholtzer, of Norristown, Pennsylvania. They resided in Chester County, Pennsylvania, until 1883, after which time, their winter home was in Norristown, and their summer residence in Longport, New Jersey. Their children were Ellis Paxson Oberholtzer and Vickers. Ellis was known in the world of letters as editor, economist, historian and biographer.

She was president of the Anti-Tobacco Society (organized by her in 1881), Longport Agassiz Microscopial Society (organized by her in 1884), the Soldiers' Aid Society, the World's Woman's Christian Temperance Union, the National Woman's Christian Temperance Union, the Pennsylvania Woman's Press Association (1903–05), and superintendent of the School Savings Bank of Pennsylvania.

Beginning in 1890, Oberholtzer devoted much of her time to the introduction of the school savings banks system into the public schools of the United States and Canada. Her bulletin on “School Savings Banks,” written for the United States Bureau of Education, and printed by the government in 1914, was widely distributed. Files of her Thrift Tidings, a quarterly she issued regularly for the public beginning in 1907, could be found in most public libraries. She was the acknowledged leader of the school savings banks movement, which was established in public schools in nearly every state in the United States and some schools in Canada.

Her published books were Violet Lee and Other Poems (Philadelphia, 1873); Come for Arbutus and Other Wild Bloom (Philadelphia, 1882); Hope's Heart Bells (Philadelphia, 1883); Daisies of Verse (Philadelphia, 1886), and Souvenirs of Occasions (Philadelphia, 1892), consisting mainly of poems read by the author on public occasions. A number of poems were set to music by different composers. Among those best known are "The Bayard Taylor Burial Ode," sung as Pennsylvania's tribute to her dead poet at his funeral service in Longwood, March 15, 1889, and "Under the Flowers," a decoration ode. She wrote extensively for periodicals and magazines on economic subjects, biography, travel, ornithology and other topics, and did considerable local reporting. She was the author of numerous dialogues and charades. She was listed in catalogues of naturalists, and had one of the finest private collections of Australian bird skins and eggs in the U.S.

Oberholtzer was one of the speakers at the first meeting of the National Council of Women in Washington, D.C. (1890), at the World's Congress of Women in Chicago in 1893, at the Geneva, Switzerland meeting in 1903, and elsewhere. She aided in instituting the university extension movement. She died February 2, 1930, and was interred at West Laurel Hill Cemetery in Bala Cynwyd, Pennsylvania.

Selected works
At an early age, she began to contribute poems and articles in prose to newspapers and magazines. Among the books she published are:

 Violet Lee, and other Poems (Philadelphia, 1872)
 Come for Arbutus, and other Wild Bloom (1882)
 Hope's Heart Bells, a story of Quaker life (1884)
 Daisies of Verse (1886)
 Souvenirs of Occasions
 Dialogues
 Letters of Travel

Her songs and hymns, set to music by different composers, were found in hymnals, and many of them in sheet form.

References

Bibliography

External links
 
 

1841 births
1930 deaths
19th-century American poets
19th-century American women writers
20th-century American poets
20th-century American women writers
American activists
American bankers
People from Chester County, Pennsylvania
American women bankers
American women poets
Burials at West Laurel Hill Cemetery
Poets from Pennsylvania
Wikipedia articles incorporating text from A Woman of the Century